Ypsilanti Township may refer to the following townships in the United States:

 Ypsilanti Township, Michigan
 Ypsilanti Township, Stutsman County, North Dakota